Zev Hirsch Bernstein (1847 in Władysławów, Augustów Governorate, Congress Poland – 1907 in Tannersville, New York) was the author and compiler of the Hatsofe B'Erez Hachadosho, the first Hebrew periodical in the United States.

Bernstein emigrated to the United States in 1870. That summer he tried publishing two newspapers with no success. In 1871, he commenced the Hatsofe, which ran for five years. After the publication ceased he became a banker. Bernstein was also the organizer of the Hebrew Encyclopedia Co.

References
Goldman, Yosef. Hebrew Printing in America, (YGBooks 2006).

1847 births
1907 deaths
People from Kudirkos Naumiestis
People from Augustów Governorate
Lithuanian Jews
Emigrants from the Russian Empire to the United States
American people of Lithuanian-Jewish descent
19th-century American newspaper publishers (people)